The Department of Oceanography and Fisheries, normally shortened to DOP/UAç, is an Azorean oceanographic institute and research arm of the University of the Azores, with its seat in the city of Horta, on the island of Faial.

History
DOP was created in 1976, under the Instituto Universitário dos Açores (University Institute of the Azores), with its seat in the city of Horta. It became one of the organic units of the University of the Azores head-quartered on the island of Faial. Since its founding, DOP assumed "the role of scientific research, conservation of marine life and sustainable use of Atlantic Ocean in the region of the Azores".

Scope

Composed of foreign and regional graduate students, the DOP/UAç is involved in scientific and academic research in marine biology and ocean studies, within the areas of ecology, marine biology, physical and chemical oceanography and fisheries. It is a multidisciplinary institution involved in cooperative research with agreements in international (MAST III, LIFE, DG-XIV), national (PRAXIS, JNICT), and regional programs.

It is a multidisciplinary organization that supports pure and applied research, forming cooperative research programs with national and private institutions. This includes providing services for industry and public service, that includes announcements in the media, museum and educational institutions. The institution emphasizes academics, through the participation of undergraduate research students (47 by October 1997) and graduate students (13 by October 1997) in research projects, as part of its academic requirements.

This includes the studies of:
 Pelagic halieutic resources (tuna and other nektonic fish species); trophic chains; and the dynamics of large pelagic species
 Ichtyodemersal resources (fishery species with commercial value in the Azores)
 Biology and genetics of oceanic squids
 Biology and population dynamics of seamount species
 Physical oceanography
 Ecotoxicology
 General ecology and behaviour of fishes and invertebrates from littoral communities
 Ecology of hydrothermal vents
 Ecology of seabird communities
 Ecology of cetaceans (related with whalewatching activities)

Structure

The department is divided into four sections:
 Marine Ecology and Biodiversity (MEBS)
 Fisheries Resources
 Oceanography
 Chemistry

Supporting these investigation units are five nuclei: fisheries statistics; documentation; imagery/multimedia; computer sciences; scientific diving. This includes several laboratories which support all the scientific and scholarly projects undertaken by DOP. At least one technician/researcher is responsible for each laboratory, that includes specific areas, such as: Marine Ecology and Biodiversity; Fisheries Resources; Aquaculture and Ethology; Instrumentation and Calibration; Chemistry; Oceanographic Monitoring and Modelling; Optics and Ageing; and Histology and Genetics.

Resources
The DOP/UAç has an oceanographic vessel R/V Arquipélago, in addition to three other vessels/boats, at its service. The vessel patrols annually, based on a crew schedule, from their port in the harbour of Horta, in the central group. These research vessels, equipped with modern equipment, along with terrestrial-based technology and laboratories are an important part of the research activities.

References

University of the Azores